James Kynge is the principal of  China Confidential and  Renminbi Compass, proprietary research services from the Financial Times.

Career
Kynge spent over two decades as a journalist in Asia, initially for Reuters and then as China Bureau Chief for the Financial Times between 1998 and 2005. He covered many of the events during this time - including the Japanese deflation, the Tiananmen Square massacre, the rise to nationhood of the five former Soviet central Asian republics in the early 1990s, the Asian financial crisis of 1997, and China's reform and opening since 1998.

Kynge speaks fluent Mandarin, and is a regular commentator on Chinese and Asian issues for media outlets including NPR, CNN and the BBC.

China Confidential surveys hundreds of consumers, manufacturers, logistics companies, employers and underground banks each month, and use their network of researchers in nine cities to generate grassroots research on the big topics of the moment, often yielding calls that challenge conventional wisdom. They also conduct custom research for individual clients using their network of researchers, survey capacity and other tools. Renminbi Compass provides research coverage on asset classes as diverse as chengtou bonds, dim sum bonds, real estate, trust products, underground banking, art and antiques, as well as traditional equity fund research.  Their proprietary data also reveals liquidity flows between these asset classes both within China and overseas. They estimate the monthly return that each key asset class offers.

His first book China Shakes The World: A Titan's Rise and Troubled Future - and the Challenge for America describes the development of China as a superpower; it has been translated into 19 languages.

Personal life
Kynge lives in Beijing, is married and has three children.

Awards and honors
In 2016, he won the 2016 Wincott Foundation award for Financial Journalist of the Year. China Shakes The World won the 2006 Financial Times and Goldman Sachs Business Book of the Year Award.

References

External links 
 Review of China Shakes The World in the Central European University Journal of Political Science
China Confidential
Renminbi Compass

British male journalists
Living people
Year of birth missing (living people)